Jump into Hell is a 1955 war film directed by David Butler. The film stars Jacques Sernas and Kurt Kasznar. As the first Hollywood film based on the war in French Indochina, the story is a fictionalized account of the Battle of Dien Bien Phu.

Plot
In 1954, Dien Bien Phu, a French-controlled fortress in Indochina, is under siege by Viet Minh rebels. Commanding officer De Castries discovers a Red Chinese officer among his Viet Minh prisoners. The general is desperate for new leadership for his men. He radios the French high command at Hanoi for help to send volunteer officers.

At French headquarters in Paris, Captain Guy Bertrand, a former prisoner of war for three years during World War II, volunteers to join. He wants to see action as well as rendezvous with his former love Gisele, who is unhappily married to Bonet, a major at the fort. Also on their way are Captain Callaux, who has been goaded into participating by his nagging, social-climbing wife, Lieutenant Heldman, a former Afrika Korps soldier who is now a legionnaire and the naïve but eager Lieutenant Maupin.

The men parachute down to the area and, with great difficulty, reach the fort. A monsoon rages and the fight drags on for weeks. Heldman heroically staves off enemy soldiers armed with explosives and kills them with a grenade before dying. Bonet attempts to stop the Viet Minh attack by approaching enemy lines under a white flag but is gunned down. Bertrand tries in vain to rescue him.

Low on ammunition, water and other supplies, Callaux, who is despondent after having learned in a letter that his wife has been unfaithful, volunteers to fetch water from a nearby river. He changes his will, leaving his wife nothing, and dispatches it via helicopter. He returns to the fort with the water but dies just as he delivers it.

The situation is hopeless. The enemy is tunneling in and, now without ammunition, the Frenchmen must resort to hand-to-hand combat. In his final act, de Castries orders Bertrand and Maupin to try to escape. De Castries takes a last look around, realizing that the end for him is near.

Cast

 Jacques Sernas as Captain Guy Bertrand (credited as Jack Sernas)
 Kurt Kasznar as Captain Jean Calluox
 Arnold Moss as General Christian De Castries
 Peter van Eyck as Lieutenant Heinrich Heldman
 Marcel Dalio as Sergeant Taite
 Norman Dupont as Lieutenant André Maupin
 Lawrence Dobkin as Major Maurice Bonet
 Patricia Blair as Gisele Bonet (credited as Pat Blake)
 Lisa Janti as Jacqueline (credited as Irene Montwill)
 Alberto Morin as Major Riviere
 Maurice Marsac as Captain Leroy
 Louis Mercier as Captain Darbley
 Peter Bourne as Lieutenant Robert
 Roger Valmy as Major Lamoreaux
 Leon Lontok as Lieutenant Pham
 George Chan as Thai tribesman
 Jacques Scott as Lieutenant De Jean (credited as Jack Scott)
 Harold Dyrenforth	as Major Flandrin
 Philip Ahn as Chinese lieutenant (uncredited)
 Gregory Gaye as Lieutenant Colonel Cartier (uncredited)
 Victor Sen Yung as Lieutenant John Smith Thatch (uncredited)

Production
Principal photography for Jump into Hell began on September 23, 1954 and lasted until late October. Battle scenes were shot at the Janes Ranch in Conejo, California. Additional battle scenes combined Warner-Pathé newsreel footage of the fall of Dien Bien Phu with live-action scenes.

Reception
In a contemporary review for the Los Angeles Mirror-News, critic Margaret Harford wrote: "At the fort, action picks up considerably, but the script remains the toughest battle of all. It's full of trite touches, labored humor and hardly skims the surface of what this picture might have been."

Reviewer Frank Miller of the Turner Classic Movies website wrote that Jump into Hell is typical of the period in which films exhibited Cold War jingoism: "The spoken prologue compares the Battle of Dienbienphu to fall of the Alamo and the British evacuation at Dunkirk. An early confrontation between French general Arnold Moss and captured Chinese officer Philip Ahn clearly identifies the enemy not as the Viet Minh, but international [c]ommunism. Little is said of the fact that the French defeat, with massive casualties before and after the surrender, helped inspire the nation to withdraw from its former colony. For all its jingoism, the film has its charms, particularly in the performances of an international cast."

Leonard Maltin called Jump into Hell a "[n]eatly paced actioner of paratroopers involved in Indochina war."

See also
 List of American films of 1955

References

Notes

Bibliography

 Evans, Alun. Brassey's Guide to War Films. Dulles, Virginia: Potomac Books, 2000. .
 Maltin, Leonard. Leonard Maltin's Movie Guide 2009. New York: New American Library, 2009 (originally published as TV Movies, then Leonard Maltin’s Movie & Video Guide), First edition 1969, published annually since 1988. .

External links
 
 
 

1955 films
1955 war films
American war films
American black-and-white films
Films directed by David Butler
Films scored by David Buttolph
First Indochina War films
Siege films
Warner Bros. films
1950s English-language films
1950s American films